Tobia is a Greek-origin word which is used as a surname and a masculine given name. People with the name include:

Surname
 Blaise Tobia (born 1953), American artist and photographer 
 Jacob Tobia (born 1991), American LGBT rights activist and television personality
 John Tobia (born 1978), American politician

Given name
 Tobia Aoun (1803–1871), Lebanese Maronite Catholic bishop
 Tobia Bocchi (born 1997), Italian athlete
 Tobia Lionelli (1647–1714), Slovene–Italian preacher and writer
 Tobia Giuseppe Loriga (born 1977), Italian boxer
 Tobia Masini (born 1976), Italian racing driver
 Tobia Nicotra, Italian document forger
 Tobia Polese (1865–1905), Italian painter

See also
 Tobias, list of people with the given name
 Tobia (disambiguation)

Surnames of Greek origin
Italian masculine given names